Western sunflower is a common name for several plants and may refer to:

Helianthus anomalus, native to the southwestern United States
Helianthus occidentalis, native to the eastern and central United States